Maryan (also Romanized as Maryān, Mar’yan, and Meryān) is a village in Kuhestani-ye Talesh Rural District, in the Central District of Talesh County, Gilan Province, Iran. At the 2006 census, its population was 86, in 19 families.

Language 
Linguistic composition of the village.

References 

Populated places in Talesh County

Azerbaijani settlements in Gilan Province